River Point is an unincorporated community and census-designated place (CDP) in Clatsop County, Oregon, United States. It was first listed as a CDP prior to the 2020 census.

It sits on the land between two rivers, the Youngs River to the west and the Wallooskee River to the north, extending to their confluence. The Youngs River is a tidal waterway leading to Youngs Bay at Astoria and thence the Columbia River.

Demographics

References 

Census-designated places in Clatsop County, Oregon
Census-designated places in Oregon